Prepops borealis is a species of plant bug in the family Miridae. It is found in North America.

Subspecies
These two subspecies belong to the species Prepops borealis:
 Prepops borealis borealis (Knight, 1923)
 Prepops borealis notatus (Knight, 1929)

References

Further reading

 

Articles created by Qbugbot
Insects described in 1923
Restheniini